KJC Games is a gaming company that publishes play-by-mail (PBM) games. Kevin Cropper started the company in 1981. It published PBM games such as Crasimoff's World, Earthwood, and It's a Crime.

History
Kevin Cropper started KJC Games in 1981 in the United Kingdom. By 1988, it was the largest PBM company in Europe. The company's first game was the hand-moderated Crasimoff's World. The computer-moderated Earthwood and It's a Crime soon followed, the latter becoming the "most popular PBM game in the world" in 1988. The same year, KJC Games processed about 15,000 turns monthly on IBM 20MB clone computers and was exploring expansion opportunities.

In 2001, KJC Games published Space Troopers—a science fiction wargame—as a play-by-email (PBEM) game at no cost to players. KJC Games also began playtesting in 2001 for Phoenix: Beyond the Stellar Empire.

In 2005, KJC Games' Mica Goldstone included the company in the "big three" PBM companies with Harlequin Games and Madhouse.

Published games

 Crasimoff's World
 Chairman
 Earthwood
 Extra Time
 It's a Crime
 Monster Island
 Beyond the Stellar Empire: Phoenix
 Quest
 Warlord

See also
 List of play-by-mail games

References

Bibliography
  
 
  
  

Companies of the United Kingdom
Play-by-mail game publishing companies
Publishing companies established in 1981